Tord Alvar Quan Lidell MBE (11 September 1908 – 7 January 1981) was a BBC radio announcer and newsreader. During the Second World War his distinctive voice became synonymous with the reading of news.

Early life
Lidell was born in Wimbledon Park, Surrey, to Swedish parents. His father John Adrian Lidell was a timber importer; his mother was Gertrud Lidell (née Lundström). Lidell attended King's College School, Wimbledon and Exeter College, Oxford. As a boy, he studied piano, piccolo, cello and singing, and was a noted actor at Oxford.

BBC
After some brief teaching and singing jobs, he joined BBC Birmingham as chief announcer, transferring to London after a year. He became deputy chief announcer in 1937, and the following year married Nancy Margaret Corfield, a lawyer's daughter. They had two daughters and a son. He made some historic broadcasts, including the announcement of Edward VIII's abdication. On 3 September 1939 he read the ultimatum to Germany from 10 Downing Street and then, at 11 a.m. introduced Neville Chamberlain who told the nation that it was at war with Germany.

It was during the Second World War that the BBC allowed its previously anonymous announcers and newsreaders to give their names - to distinguish them from enemy propagandists. During the war, "Here is the news, and this is Alvar Lidell reading it" became an inadvertent catchphrase. Announcing the British victory at El Alamein, he said "Here is the news, and cracking good news it is too!" In 1943 he served with the RAF as an intelligence officer (some of the time at Bletchley Park,) but returned to the BBC a year later. In 1946 he was appointed chief announcer on the new BBC Third Programme, where he remained for six years.

In 1952 the BBC's news service was reorganised, and he returned as a newsreader, also doing a little television work. He was appointed an Member of the Order of the British Empire (MBE) in 1964 and retired in 1969. In 1979 he published an article about the deteriorating standards of speech at the BBC in The Listener - the BBC immediately set up a panel of experts to report on the matter. Lidell also worked as a narrator, and recorded over 237 volumes for Books for the Blind, including long works such as Anna Karenina. As a baritone, he gave recitals and recorded with Gerald Moore at the piano. In 1970 Lidell was heard as narrator on the Apple Records recording of The Whale by composer John Tavener.

Recordings of Lidell's news bulletins have been included in many films set in Britain during the Second World War, such as the movie Battle of Britain (1969).

In later life he lived for a time at Little Knighton, Worcestershire, England. He died at Northwood, Middlesex, aged 72.

References

 Oxford Dictionary of National Biography

External links
Alvar Lidell announces the German invasion of Holland, Belgium and Luxembourg, May 10, 1940
Alvar Lidell announces the Japanese attack on US targets in the Pacific, December 7, 1941
Alvar Lidell reading the BBC news in March 1945
Alvar Lidell announcing the Abdication of King Edward VIII in 1936
Alvar Lidell announcing on BBC Radio that Germany had invaded Poland – September 1, 1939

1908 births
1981 deaths
People educated at King's College School, London
BBC newsreaders and journalists
Radio and television announcers
Alumni of Exeter College, Oxford
Members of the Order of the British Empire